California and Hawaiian Sugar Company (C&H Sugar) is an American sugar processing and distribution company. Originally organized as a co-operative in 1921, it encountered a severe decline in sugar markets and passed through a series of owners in the last half of the 20th century. In 2017, its Crockett, California, refinery processed its last shipment of Hawaiian sugar but continues to produce sugar from other locations. The Crockett Refinery employs more than 450 people and produces 14% of the nation's cane sugar.

History
The California and Hawai’ian Sugar Company was founded in 1906 and operated from 1921 to 1993 as an agricultural cooperative marketing association owned by the member sugar companies in Hawai’i. Its headquarters are in Crockett under the Carquinez Bridge in unincorporated Contra Costa County, California.

In 1993, the member companies sold their interests in C&H to Alexander & Baldwin in Honolulu, and the refining company's status changed from a cooperative to a stock corporation. Alexander & Baldwin subsequently sold its majority share to an investment group, Citicorp Venture Capital (CVC) in 1998, retaining a 40% common stock interest in the recapitalized company. American Sugar Refining bought C&H in 2006, merging it with its other sugar operations. C&H revenues and profits continued to decline into the 21st Century as sugar prices fell and labor costs rose.

Products and market
The C&H brand is one of the leading sugar brands in the company's markets (where it is not the de facto leader), largely due to advertisements stressing their exclusive use of cane sugar, believed by some to be superior to sugar from the sugar beet. C&H sells a variety of cane sugar products, including white granulated, brown, baker's (superfine), powdered and organic.

C&H's primary market is west of the Mississippi River in the United States, although some sugar is sold in various east coast stores. A number of restaurants, bakeries and hotels have C&H sugar shipped directly to them where it is not available through local distribution channels. More than 70 types, grades, and package sizes are sold within the two major groupings of grocery and industrial products. About  of sugar per year are processed.

The refinery at Crockett, California formerly relied on sugar cane from Hawai’i. However, the country's sugar cane production faced increasing competition from other cane producers in countries such as Brazil and Vietnam. In 2016, citing a loss of profitability, the last Hawai’ian cane grower, the Hawai’ian Commercial & Sugar Company harvested its final Hawai’ian sugar cane crop, and ceased refining operations there. Lands still owned by the company will be converted to other crops and uses, such as sorghum and biofuel crops.

See also

Crockett, California

Notes

References

External links 
 C&H Pure Cane Sugar
 

Sugar companies of the United States
Sugar plantations in Hawaii
Agricultural cooperatives in the United States
Business in Hawaii
Companies based in Contra Costa County, California
American companies established in 1906
Food and drink companies established in 1906
1906 establishments in California
1906 establishments in Hawaii
Agriculture in Hawaii
Economy of the Western United States
Food and drink in the San Francisco Bay Area
Food and drink companies based in California